The Irish Rovers is a group of Irish musicians that originated in Toronto, Canada. Formed in 1963 and named after the traditional song "The Irish Rover" they are best known for their international television series, contributing to the popularization of Irish Music in North America, and for the songs "The Unicorn", "Drunken Sailor", "Wasn't That a Party", "The Orange and the Green", "Whiskey on a Sunday", "Lily the Pink", "Finnegan's Wake" and "The Black Velvet Band".

The primary voices heard in the group's early songs were Will Millar (tenor), Jimmy Ferguson (baritone), George Millar and Joe Millar, and in the last twenty years, also John Reynolds and Ian Millar. Wilcil McDowell's accordion has been a signature sound of the band throughout their more than fifty years.

Founding member George Millar and his cousin Ian are both from Ballymena, Davey Walker from Armagh, Sean O'Driscoll from Cork, Gerry O'Connor from Dundalk, with Morris Crum from Carnlough and percussionist Fred Graham from Belfast. Flute and whistle player Geoffrey Kelly was born in Dumfries, Scotland.

In the 1980s, the group briefly renamed itself The Rovers. During this period, their "Wasn't That a Party" led to crossover success in the country rock genre.

The Irish Rovers have represented Canada at five World Expos, and in 2018 were honoured as one of Ireland's greatest exports at Dublin, Ireland's EPIC The Irish Emigration Museum.

History

Northern Ireland
The brothers George Millar and Will Millar were both born in Ballymena, County Antrim, Northern Ireland. The children grew up in a musical household as their father Bob played button-key accordion for several bands throughout the years. Their cousin Joe Millar, who also sang, took part in the family kitchen parties playing button-key accordion and harmonica. As children, George and Will performed with their sister, Sandra Beech as "The Millar Kids" in Ireland, before the family emigrated to Canada.

Early years
In 1963, George met fellow Irish native Jimmy Ferguson at an Irish function in Toronto. They sang together until dawn, and founded the Irish Rovers. According to a Calgary Herald article in 1971, "George and Jimmy formed the first Irish Rovers for an amateur variety show in Toronto and won."

George's cousin, Joe also soon emigrated to Toronto and was recruited as he stepped off the plane.

The name "The Irish Rovers" was suggested by George's mother. The traditional Irish song about a sailing ship had been a favourite from their kitchen parties in Ballymena. For a short time, George, Jimmy and Joe were joined by Vic Marcus and Doug Henderson. George's father, Bob, became The Irish Rovers's first manager booking the new band at folk song festivals, clubs, hootenannies and The Port o' Call. According to a 1964 newspaper in the Millars' home town in Ireland, "The folk singing 'boom' in the United States and Canada proved profitable for three young Ballymena men who form the nucleus of a popular, Toronto-based group who call themselves 'The Irish Rovers.'”

In the early 60s, Will Millar and his friend Brian Evans performed in a Toronto Calypso group, The Kalypso Kews. After moving to Calgary, Will formed a folk trio in Calgary along with another Ulster native, Derek Swinson. He also developed quite a following singing at Phil's Pancake House, and then landing a job singing on Calgary's Just 4 Fun, a local TV show for children.

In the latter half of 1964, after more than six months performing in the Toronto area, George and Jimmy left to visit Will in Calgary. In 1979, Jimmy told Canadian Music Magazine, "We actually formed the group in Toronto. I sang, George played guitar and at that time Joe was playing a little button key accordion. We were ambitious in those days, we'd played the clubs to death in Toronto and we didn't know what to do next; what direction to take. So we decided to visit Will in Calgary, ended up staying there, and the Irish Rovers became four. "". Joe moved his family out from Toronto, and the band continued in Calgary.

George was enrolled in a local Calgary high school and Jimmy worked at a local Calgary slaughter house. Jimmy's job would last but a few hours. George soon quit school and Will's home became the new home base for the band.

The Irish Rovers became regulars at Calgary's Depression Coffeehouse, a folk club operated by John Uren that also contributed to the start of Joni Mitchell's career.

"US America"
Will introduced the group to his manager Les Weinstein who became the band's full-time manager, while Will became the band leader.

The Rovers drove to California in 1966, hoping to perform in the folk clubs there. On the way, their car broke down near Denuchi's, an Italian restaurant owned by two Irish immigrants in northern California. The boys were given room and board and an introduction to Jan Brainerd, a booking agent who helped them secure an appearance at The Purple Onion in San Francisco where they played sold-out houses for five months. The group was then booked at other folk clubs across California.

In 1966, the Rovers signed a recording contract with Decca Records with Charles Dant and recorded their first album, The First of the Irish Rovers, at The Ice House in Pasadena. The album was successful enough to warrant another album, which included their first hit, which was from a song originally written and recorded in 1962 by Shel Silverstein, The Unicorn. Glen Campbell played guitar on the original recording. After recording the album, Joe left the band for a more "reliable" income for a family man. It was at this time that they invited All-Ireland Champion Wilcil McDowell to join the band. After the success of "The Unicorn", Joe returned to the band. The album included the Irish tunes "The Orange and the Green" and "The Black Velvet Band". Wilcil's accordion has continued to be a signature sound of the band.

Starting in the late 60s, the Irish Rovers performed on various North American television programs including several appearances on the TV western The Virginian, as well as The Smothers Brothers Comedy Hour, The Mike Douglas Show, The Dating Game, The Pig And Whistle, and The Beachcombers.

In 1968, they were named "Folk Group of the Year" by the predecessor of the JUNO Awards, and in 1969 they received a Grammy Award nomination for "Folk Performance of the Year".

The Rovers Era
In the early 1980s, the group adjusted its style and began aiming itself towards the country-rock field. Renamed The Rovers, the group scored a major international hit with "Wasn't That a Party" and also found success with the Christmas novelty recording "Grandma Got Run Over By a Reindeer". By the late 1980s, however, the group had reverted to their original Irish Rovers branding.

Television
In 1971, The Irish Rovers were offered their own CBC-produced television series, The Irish Rovers Show. While entertaining a family audience, the show promoted Ireland and Irish music to North Americans. Guest stars included their friends The Clancy Brothers and Tommy Makem, Johnny Cash, Carl Perkins, Bobby Darin, Glen Campbell, Vera Lynn and Anne Murray. Visits from Shari Lewis and her puppets, including Lamb Chop, were audience favourites. There were regularly taped visits to Northern and Southern Ireland, Scotland, England, New Zealand, P.E.I., Newfoundland, New Brunswick, Banff and even Alert – at the tip of Ellesmere Island – the farthest, northerly inhabited base in the world.

"The Irish Rovers Show" ran for 7 years, winning an ACTRA Award for Best Variety Performance.  Brothers Will and George Millar co-wrote the majority of their original Irish compositions. Producer and Director Ken Gibson and Michael Watt often hosted special effects technicians from L.A. who were learning the new green screen technology, which were used for comedic leprechaun segments featuring Will, George and Jimmy, and is later used in The Mother Goose Video Treasury in 1987. The Rovers then continued with another television series on the Global Television Network in conjunction with Ulster Television in Ireland.

Although most of their music focuses on the band's Irish roots, in the early 1980s The Irish Rovers recorded an unknown novelty Christmas song written by Randy Brooks. Record producer Jack Richardson produced The Rovers' album, It Was A Night Like This. The single release of "Grandma Got Run Over by a Reindeer" rose to the top 20 in Canada within a week of airplay. Exposure of the music on television also added to the popularity of their music.

In 1980, their crossover hit recording of Tom Paxton's "Wasn't That a Party", which was inspired by the boys' own after-show partying, put them at the top of the charts again. In 1981, the group starred in their second Canadian TV series: The Rovers Comedy House, a seven-part CBC series of comedy and boisterous Irish music produced by Ken Gibson. For most of the 1980s the band was known as "The Rovers" and followed up hits with songs such as "Chattanoogie Shoe Shine Boy" and "No More Bread and Butter".

Their third television series, Party with the Rovers, ran from 1984 to 1986 with Jack Richardson as Musical Director and Ken Gibson as Executive Producer. The show was set in a traditional pub setting featuring music sessions with the band performing together with Liam Clancy, Tommy Makem, John Allan Cameron, Kenny Rogers, Lonnie Donegan, Andy Gibb, Rita Coolidge, Ronnie Prophet, and many others. The series was produced for Global in conjunction with Ulster Television in Ireland, and was syndicated around the world.

The band members became Canadian citizens after Canada's Prime Minister, Pierre Elliott Trudeau, asked them to do so, to officially represent Canada around the world. By 1989 they had represented Canada at five world Expos: Montreal (1967), Osaka, Japan (1970), Okinawa, Japan (1976), Vancouver (1986), and Brisbane, Australia (1988). In recognition of their quarter century of contributions of Canadian music to the International music world, they were awarded Canada's top music honour, the Performing Rights Organization's (PROCAN) Harold Moon Award. With their double album 25th Anniversary Collection in 1989, which featured the backing of The Chieftains and songs written by, amongst others, Randy Bachman, Bryan Adams and Jim Vallance, the band was, once again, officially known as The Irish Rovers, but many fans still refer to them as The Rovers.

Will announced his departure in 1994 and has become a successful artist focusing on the Ireland of old as a favourite subject matter. Upon departure, George replaced him as bandleader and hired fellow musicians John Reynolds and Wallace Hood.

After a court battle for the name of "The Irish Rovers", the full band continued to tour, then filmed the video "The Irish Rovers, Live and Well", plus the CD, 'Celtic Collection: The Next Thirty Years'. Over the following two years they followed up with two more albums, "Gems", and "Come Fill Up Your Glasses". While the band was on tour in Worcester, Massachusetts in October 1997, Jimmy Ferguson died of a heart attack.

For a return to television in 2011, the band filmed the television special, The Irish Rovers, Home in Ireland. Locations for the special included Dunluce Castle, Carnlough Harbour, Portglenone, and various spots along the northeast coast of Northern Ireland. The show was transmitted in 2011 and 2012 across the PBS Network in North America.

In 2012 The Irish Rovers Christmas television special, which was filmed at various locations in Banff National Park, Sunshine Village and Chatham-Kent's Capitol Theatre, was shown across the PBS Network throughout the US and Canada and was broadcast in New Zealand on Sky TV.

In 2015 The Rovers filmed their own 50th Anniversary LIVE on St. Patrick's Day concert in Nanaimo, Canada. Shaw Communications also filmed behind the scenes at the event for a music documentary titled "The Irish Rovers 50th Anniversary Special". It was broadcast nationally in Canada on SHAW Video on Demand in 2015 and 2016.

The two-DVD set "LIVE on St. Patrick's Day" which was filmed at The Port Theatre on Vancouver Island and Lismore, Ireland, was released in 2017. All three television specials were released on DVD and may be rebroadcast during the holiday seasons.

Rover Records and touring
The band continued to tour and record. Joe Millar retired from the band in 2005 when his son, Ian Millar, took up the family ranks. Joe and Ian performed once together on stage before Ian took over his father's spot.

The present line-up of George Millar, Wilcil McDowell, Ian Millar, Sean O'Driscoll, Fred Graham, Morris Crum, Geoffrey Kelly and Gerry O'Connor continues to tour Canada, the United States, Australia and New Zealand.

In 1993 the band formed their own record company, Rover Records, which allowed them artistic freedom that as a younger band they could not afford. George Millar continues to write songs for the band, with Rover Records producing their last sixteen albums including Celtic Collection, Come Fill Up Your Glasses, Down by the Lagan Side, Still Rovin' After All These Years, and their Greatest Hits albums, 40 Years a-Rovin', and The Irish Rovers's Gems. Their Irish homeland continues to be the primary subject of their music, as in "Erin's Green Isle", "I'll Return", "Dear Little Shamrock Shore", "Dunluce Castle", "Home to Bantry Bay", "The Dublin Pub Crawl", and "Gracehill Fair". Recently, their recording of "Drunken Sailor" reached a younger audience on YouTube.

In 2010, The Irish Rovers marked their 45th anniversary with the release of the CD Gracehill Fair, which won a local music award on their home base of Vancouver Island.

The band returned to the World Music charts in 2011 with their album, Home in Ireland.

In 2012, their single, "The Titanic", released from their Drunken Sailor album, focused attention on Belfast and the Harland and Wolff shipyard that had built the Titanic a century before. After the song, and accompanying video made headlines in Belfast, N. Ireland, it was also featured in a Canadian documentary for the CBC which aided in returning the credit of building the ship to the Northern Ireland shipyards of Belfast. The album was produced in response to YouTube activity.

The band slowed down their touring schedule in their fiftieth year. The release of The Irish Rovers, 50 Years compilation album supported their Farewell To Rovin' Tour which will take a few years to complete. In 2018, Wilcil McDowell retired from touring and keyboardist Morris Crum replaced him, leaving George Millar as the only remaining current member tied to the 1960s lineup. Bass player Vic Marcus died on August 30, 2019 in Ross Memorial Hospital in Lindsay. He was 80 years old.

After the long tours are done, the band intends to continue recording and performing for special events. Former band member John Reynolds died in February 2021 in his home in Comox, British Columbia. Founding member Joe Millar died on February 10, 2023.

Personnel

Current members
George Millar – vocals, guitar, bouzouki (1963–present)
Ian Millar – vocals, bass guitar, guitar (2005–present)
Fred Graham – drums, bodhran, bones, vocals (2007–present)
Geoffrey Kelly – tin whistle, flute, uilleann pipes, vocals (2008–present)
Gerry O'Connor – fiddle (2013–present)
Davey Walker – keyboards, vocals (2019–present)
Kevin Evans –  vocals, guitar (2021–present)
Shane Farrell – banjo, mandolin (2021–present)
Jimmy Keane – accordion (2021–present)

Former members
Jimmy Ferguson – vocals (1963–97; died on tour 1997)
Joe Millar – vocals, accordion, harmonica, bass guitar (1963–68 / 1969–2005; died 2023)
Will Millar – vocals, guitar, banjo, mandolin, tin whistle (1964–94)
Vic Marcus - vocals, bass guitar (1963-64)
Doug Henderson - vocals, banjo (1963-64)
Wilcil McDowell – accordion (1968–2020; retired from touring 2018)
Kevin McKeown – drums, bodhran, bones, vocals (1984–2002)
John Reynolds – vocals, guitar, harmonica (1995–2012; died 2021)
Wallace Hood – mandolin, Irish bouzouki, cittern, tenor banjo, guitar, tin whistle (1995–2005)
Sean O'Driscoll – mandolin, tenor banjo, bouzouki, box, vocals (1997–2021)
Paul Lawton – drums, bodhran, bones (2002–2005; died 2005)
Bruce Aitken – drums (2007–2008)
Morris Crum – accordion, keyboards, vocals (2012–2021)

Honours
 1968 Winners, RPM Awards (predecessor of the JUNO Award), "Folk Group of the Year" 
 1968 GRAMMY Awards Nomination, "Folk Performance of the Year”
 1971 Winners ACTRA Award, Best Variety Performance
 1975 JUNO Award Nomination, Best Album Cover, "Emigrate! Emigrate!”
 1979 Winners, PROCAN Harold Moon Award for International Achievement for TV Program
 1981 JUNO Award Nomination, Single of the Year, "Wasn’t That A Party”
 1981 JUNO Award Nomination, Folk Artist of the Year
 1982 JUNO Award Nomination, Group of the Year
 1982 JUNO Award Nomination, Country Group of the Year
 1982 JUNO Award Nomination, Folk Artist of the Year
 1983 JUNO Award Nomination, Country Group of the Year
 2010 Winners, VIMA Award (Vancouver Island Music Awards), SOCAN Song of the Year, "Gracehill Fair"
 2023 Canadian Folk Music Awards Nomination, Single of the Year, "Hey Boys Sing Us A Song”

Television specials / VHS & DVD
 America's Music: Folk 1 [Volume 7] – VHS, 1983
 Party with the Rovers – VHS, 1988
 The Irish Rovers Silver Anniversary – CBC, 1989
 The Irish Rovers Celebrate 30 Years – CBC,1994
 Celebrate! The First Thirty Years – VHS, 1994
 Live and Well – VHS, 1995
 Home In Ireland – PBS TV / DVD, 2011
 The Irish Rovers Christmas – PBS TV / DVD, 2012
 50th Anniversary, LIVE on St. Patrick's Day – SHAW TV on Demand / 2 DVD Set, 2017

Television Series, International
 The Irish Rovers – 1971, 7 years. CBC
 The Rovers Comedy House – 1981, 2 years. Global Television / Ulster TV
 Party with The Rovers – 1984, 3 years. Global Television / Ulster TV
 Superspecial – 1980's. CBC

Discography

Albums

Singles

References

External links

Will Millar's Website
The Irish Rovers' discography at the Balladeers
 
Canadian Encyclopedia entry
 canadianbands.com entry
 Entries at 45cat.com
Irish Rovers YouTube Channel

Irish folk musical groups
Canadian folk music groups
Canadian Celtic music groups
Musical groups established in 1963
Attic Records (Canada) artists
1963 establishments in Ontario